Arisaema section Sinarisaema is a section of the genus Arisaema.

Description
Plants in this section have a subglobose tuber with 1–2 radiate, sessile, leaves with 5 –25 leaflets.

Distribution
Plants from this section are found from Yemen to Southeast Asia, with one species from Africa.

Species
Arisaema section Sinarisaema comprises the following species:

References

Plant sections